The Joondalup Family Health Study (JFHS) will be an extensively characterized, community-based cohort study, which will investigate the complex interplay of environmental, lifestyle and genetic components that affect the risk of common conditions such as asthma, heart disease and diabetes. The Study will take place in Joondalup, Western Australia and will have a strong focus on families and the health of both children and adults.

The Study is being led by a team of researchers from Western Australian Institute for Medical Research, The University of Western Australia, Edith Cowan University, Curtin University, Lions Eye Institute and Ear Science Institute Australia.

Patrons
His Excellency Dr Kenneth Comninos Michael AC, Governor of Western Australia is the Patron of the JFHS.

Clinical Professor Fiona Wood AM is the Medical Patron of the JFHS.

Study Design
This longitudinal study will seek to collect extensive data (over 3,000 measures on each person) from up to 80,000 participants, who will be asked to undergo a comprehensive health check approximately every 3 years. The appointment will include questions about lifestyle and diet, in addition to height, weight and other tests such as heart, lung, vision and hearing tests.

Phase 1
JFHS Phase 1 will pilot the Study with 2,000 participants, ~ 700 nuclear families, including adults and children (6 years and up). Phase 1 will also be a stand-alone study, which will produce validated research methods, data and analysis.

Phase 1 will collect data on under-researched but important conditions in the Australian community. The areas chosen cover both clinical and social areas of health:
Allergies
Cardiovascular disease
Child health and development
Cognitive psychology
Ears and hearing disorders 
Exercise physiology 
Eye and vision disorders 
Diabetes
General practice
Metabolic disease
Paediatric respiratory medicine
Social determinants of health
Spinal pain

Phase 2
JFHS Phase 2 will expand on the JFHS Phase 1 cohort and seek to collect over 3,500 measures from up to 80,000 volunteers from Joondalup every three years.

In addition to the research areas described in Phase 1, detailed parameters will be collected within the following major research areas: 
Cancer
Cardiovascular disease
Education
Environmental health 
Infectious disease 
Nutrition and endocrinology
Obstetrics and gynaecology 
Paediatric health
Psychology
Renal disease
Respiratory health
Speech and literacy

Participation

Eligibility
For Phase 1, participants will be a community-based, randomly selected sample of 2000 eligible individuals living in the community of Joondalup. Only households in which two or more generations of families are living together with children over the age of 6 years will be studied.

For Phase 2, all residents living in Joondalup will be eligible to participate.

What participation involves
Participants who choose to take part in the JFHS will be asked to complete a questionnaire on their medical history, behaviours and lifestyle, mental health and community participation. They will also be asked to attend the Health & Wellness Building at Edith Cowan University to have physical measurements taken. Participants will also be asked for a blood sample.

Community consultation
An extensive program of community outreach has been conducted by the JFHS team. This included a detailed postal survey of 7,500 residents and a Community Forum. Of those who responded (16% of total surveyed), 96% believed that it was very or quite important to conduct a large-scale family health study; 85% were very or quite interested in participating in the JFHS; and 85% were very or quite likely to allow their children to participate.

Metropolitan general practitioners were also surveyed on their views on a genome health project. This survey found that most GPs were supportive of such a project, and the majority of those surveyed would be willing to discuss and recruit patients for the project.

Other outreach activities have included briefing members of parliament, information stalls at Lakeside Shopping Centre, interactive displays and articles in community and council newsletters.

Endorsements

Government
The JFHS has been endorsed by community leaders representing the City of Joondalup - including local, state and federal parliamentarians.

Health organisations
Western Australian health groups who have endorsed the JFHS include:
AusBiotech
Association for the Blind of WA
Australian Medical Association, WA Branch
Biotechnology Australia
Diabetes WA
Joondalup Health Campus
The McCusker Foundation for Alzheimer's Disease Research
Royal Perth Hospital
Sir Charles Gairdner Hospital
St John of God Hospital
Women's and Infants Research Foundation

National and international endorsements
National and international organisations who have endorsed the JFHS include:
Australian Genome Alliance
Public Population Project in Genomics Consortium (P3G), a non-for-profit international consortium to promote collaboration between researchers in the field of population genomics.

Other
Cerner Corporation
Committee for Perth
IBM
Scitech

Other studies
The Joondalup Family Health Study will build on the experience of a number of previous large cohort studies that have been conducted in Western Australia, including the Busselton Health Study, the Health-in-Men Study, and the Raine Study.

Sources

External links
Joondalup Family Health Study Website
City of Joondalup Website
Laboratory for Genetic Epidemiology, Western Australian Institute for Medical Research
Western Australian Institute for Medical Research
University of Western Australia
Edith Cowan University
Curtin University of Technology
Lions Eye Institute
Ear Science Institute Australia

Epidemiological study projects
Health in Western Australia
Australian medical research
Cohort studies
Joondalup